Senator Wilson may refer to:

Members of the Northern Irish Senate
Paddy Wilson (1933–1973), Northern Irish Senator from 1969 to 1973

Members of the United States Senate
Ephraim King Wilson II (1821–1891), U.S. Senator from Maryland from 1885 to 1891
George A. Wilson (1884–1953), U.S. Senator from Iowa from 1943 to 1949
Henry Wilson (1812–1875), U.S. Senator from Massachusetts from 1855 to 1873
James F. Wilson (1828–1895), U.S. Senator from Iowa from 1883 to 1895
James J. Wilson (1775–1824), U.S. Senator from New Jersey from 1815 to 1821
John L. Wilson (1850–1912), U.S. Senator from Washington from 1895 to 1899
Pete Wilson (born 1933), U.S. Senator from California from 1983 to 1991
Robert Wilson (Missouri politician) (1803–1870), U.S. Senator from Missouri from 1862 to 1863

United States state senate members
Charlie Wilson (Ohio politician) (1943–2013), Ohio State Senate
Charlie Wilson (Texas politician) (1933–2010), Texas State Senate
Claire Wilson (politician) (born c. 1956), Washington State Senate
David S. Wilson (born 1980s), Alaska State Senate
DeWitt C. Wilson (1827–1895), Wisconsin State Senate
Earl Wilson (politician) (1906–1990), Indiana State Senate
Eugene McLanahan Wilson (1833–1890), Minnesota State Senate
Eugene T. Wilson (1852–1923), Washington State Senate
Frederica Wilson (born 1942), Florida State Senate
George P. Wilson (1840–1920), Minnesota State Senate
George W. Wilson (politician) (1840–1909), Ohio State Senate
Herbert A. Wilson (1870–1934), Massachusetts State Senate
Isaac Wilson (1780–1848), New York State Senate
James Charles Wilson (1816–1861), Texas State Senate
Jason Wilson (politician) (born 1968), Ohio State Senate
Jerome L. Wilson (1931–2019), New York State Senate
Jim Wilson (Oklahoma politician) (born 1947), Oklahoma State Senate
Joe Wilson (American politician) (born 1947), South Carolina State Senate
John Henry Wilson (Kentucky politician) (1846–1923), Kentucky State Senate
John Lyde Wilson (1784–1849), South Carolina State Senate
John Thomas Wilson (1811–1891), Ohio State Senate
Joseph Harvey Wilson (1810–1884), North Carolina State Senate
Lori Wilson (1937–2019), Florida State Senate
Louis Dicken Wilson (1789–1847), North Carolina State Senate
Mike Wilson (Kentucky politician) (born 1951), Kentucky State Senate
Robert Patterson Clark Wilson (1834–1916), Missouri State Senate
Roger B. Wilson (born 1948), Missouri State Senate
Samuel Franklin Wilson (1845–1923), Tennessee State Senate
Stanley C. Wilson (1879–1967), Vermont State Senate
Stanyarne Wilson (1860–1928), South Carolina State Senate
Stephen Fowler Wilson (1821–1897), Pennsylvania State Senate
Steve Wilson (Ohio politician) (fl. 1970s–2010s), Ohio State Senate
Thomas B. Wilson (1852–1929), New York State Senate
Thomas Wilson (Minnesota politician) (1827–1910), Minnesota State Senate
Thomas Wilson (Virginia politician) (1765–1826), Virginia State Senate
William C. Wilson (judge) (1812–1882), Vermont State Senate
William K. Wilson (1817–1898), Wisconsin State Senate
William Wilson (Wisconsin politician) (fl. 1850s–1870s), Wisconsin State Senate
Yvonne S. Wilson (1929–2019), Missouri State Senate